József Károly Hell (Slovak: Jozef Karol Hell, German: Josef/ph Karl Hell, Hungarian: Hell József Károly) (15 May 1713, Szélakna (Windschacht, Piarg, now Štiavnické Bane) - 11 March 1789, Selmecbánya (Schemnitz, now Banská Štiavnica)) was a Hungarian mining engineer and inventor, who invented the water-pillar (water pump machine) in 1749 (first use 1753). It is mainly used today for oil extraction. He also proposed construction of the tajchy reservoirs around Selmecbánya (Schemnitz, Banská Štiavnica). He was a student of Sámuel Mikoviny in 1737. Regardless of his nationality, he is a pride of both Hungarian and Slovak nations.

His first machine was able to pump water up from the depth of 212 meters. Jozef Karol Hell later built the pumping machines in 1749-1768, which belongs to the best technology in this field worldwide.

References

External links 
 Jozef Karol Hell – významný  konštruktér a vynálezca (in Slovak)
 Berechnung der Luftmaschine, welche in der Niederungarischen Bergstadt zu Schemnitz bey der Amalia Schacht, vom Herrn Joseph Karl Höll, Oberkunstmeistern erfunden, erbauet und im Jahre 1753, den 23. März ist angelassen worden. Wien 1771.

1713 births
1789 deaths
Hell, Jozsef Karoly
Hell, Jozsef Karoly